The 1973 British Grand Prix (formally the John Player Grand Prix) was a Formula One motor race held at Silverstone on 14 July 1973. It was race 9 of 15 in both the 1973 World Championship of Drivers and the 1973 International Cup for Formula One Manufacturers.

The race is known for the first lap pile-up which ultimately caused eleven cars to retire. The accident happened when Jody Scheckter, running fourth in his McLaren, spun across the track at Woodcote Corner at the end of the first lap, causing many other cars to collide and crash. The incident eliminated nine cars, including all three works Surtees cars, while Brabham driver Andrea de Adamich suffered a broken ankle that ended his F1 career. The race was stopped at the end of the second lap, before being restarted over the original 67-lap distance with 18 of the original 29 cars (David Purley and Graham McRae having also retired in separate incidents).

On the first start, a swift start by Jackie Stewart brought him from fourth to first in less than half a lap. At Becketts Corner, Stewart out-braked race leader Ronnie Peterson and took the lead. However, the massive pile-up at the end of the first lap caused the race to be restarted and Stewart had to start from fourth again. This time it was Niki Lauda who had an excellent start and moved up behind Peterson into second, with Stewart third. Stewart passed Lauda on lap 2, and charged after Peterson. On lap 6, Stewart again tried to pass Peterson for the lead, but the Swedish driver shut the door; Stewart lost control of his Tyrrell and spun off into the thick grass. Although he was able to continue, Stewart ended up finishing 10th, one lap down.

Another notable drive came from James Hunt in his Hesketh Racing March, who ran fourth for most of the race and was part of a four-way battle for the lead between himself, Peterson, Denny Hulme and Peter Revson. American driver Revson took his first Grand Prix victory by 2.8 seconds from Peterson.

The pile-up was to be a factor in this being the last World Championship F1 race held on the original Silverstone layout: a chicane would be added at Woodcote shortly before the next British Grand Prix at Silverstone two years later. MotoGP, which would come to Silverstone from the Isle of Man in 1977, would use the original layout until 1986.

Qualifying

Qualifying classification

Race

First start and multi-car pileup
The race started at 2.00pm local time, it featured the most cars to start a grand prix as it featured 28 cars in rows of three by two. Ronnie Peterson led away but a very quick start by Jackie Stewart brought him from fourth to second but passed Peterson to take the lead at Beckets. Carlos Reutemann was in third with Denny Hulme and Jody Scheckter behind him. As the exited Woodcote corner to complete the first lap, Stewart led Peterson and Reutemann but carnage was happening behind them. Scheckter tried to pass Hulme on the outside Scheckter's car went wide and spun right across the track and it hit the retaining wall of the pits and bounced back into the middle of the track. Hulme escaped undamaged, Francois Cevert, James Hunt, Peter Revson and Clay Regazzoni also went by. The big one then happened as Scheckter's car ricocheted back from the pit wall, Revson struck Scheckter's rear wing and then all hell broke loose as the rest of the field crashed into the wrecks or dodged about to miss the wreckage. Nine cars were involved in the resulting carnage, Andrea de Adamich had crashed headlong into the barriers on the outside of the track and he was trapped in the cockpit of his Brabham with a broken ankle. Apart from minor bruises and shakings no-one else was hurt but the Surtees cars of Mike Hailwood, Carlos Pace and Jochen Mass were smashed up. The Shadow's were also involved, Jackie Oliver's car was wrecked, George Follmer's car was ripped open. The Embassy Hill-entered Shadow of Graham Hill was struck in the rear and a wishbone broken, but Hill drove it round back to the pits under its own power. The BRM of Jean-Pierre Beltoise and the works March of Roger Williamson were wrecked, as was the McLaren of Scheckter. The race organisation acted instantly and the race was red flagged indicating without argument or discussion that the race was stopped and would be started again later. Meanwhile, those ahead of the accident were still racing, until they ended the lap, when they all came to a rapid stop at the scene of the crash. It took 30 minutes to release de Adamich from the wreckage of the Brabham plus an hour to clear away the wrecked cars and the debris. The cars that escaped were wheeled back to the starting grid and Hill's Shadow was repaired in the pits, and Niki Lauda's BRM that had been in the pits all the time had a new drive-shaft fitted. Hunt's March needed a new airbox as his original one was damaged in the wreck and borrowed Mike Beuttler's airbox from his car.

Second start
Drivers were allowed to use spare cars but none were used, Lauda's BRM and Hill's Shadow having been repaired during the red flag period. Non-starters included de Adamich who had been taken to hospital, Scheckter who was barred by McLaren as several team bosses including John Surtees wanted to throw him out for causing the crash, Graham McRae's Iso-Marlboro which had a throttle issue and couldn't restart, and David Purley's March which had spun off before the big one and didn't restart.

Other drivers who did not take the restart included Oliver, Follmer, Beltoise, Williamson, Purley, Pace, Hailwood, and Mass. It was 3.30 p.m. before the track was clear and there were nineteen starters ready for the restart over the original distance on 67 laps. At 3:35pm the depleted field moved up on to the starting grid. Everyone took up their original positions, leaving gaps for those who had been eliminated. This time it was Lauda who had an excellent start and moved up behind Peterson into second, with Stewart third. Stewart passed Lauda on lap 2 and charged after Peterson. On lap 6, Stewart again tried to pass Peterson for the lead, but the Swedish driver shut the door; Stewart lost control of his Tyrrell and spun off into the thick grass. Although he was able to continue, Stewart ended up finishing 10th, one lap down.

Classification

Championship standings after the race

Drivers' Championship standings

Constructors' Championship standings

References

British Grand Prix
British Grand Prix
Grand Prix